Metaxymorphus is a genus of beetles in the family Carabidae, containing the following species:

 Metaxymorphus affinis Peringuey, 1896 
 Metaxymorphus agilis Peringuey, 1896 
 Metaxymorphus angustissimus (Motschulsky, 1864) 
 Metaxymorphus atriceps Peringuey, 1896 
 Metaxymorphus confusus (Basilewsky, 1956) 
 Metaxymorphus cursor Peringuey, 1896 
 Metaxymorphus cycloderus Chaudoir, 1877 
 Metaxymorphus debilis Peringuey, 1899 
 Metaxymorphus deceptor (Peringuey, 1896) 
 Metaxymorphus discipennis (Motschulsky, 1864) 
 Metaxymorphus endroedyi (Basilewsky, 1986) 
 Metaxymorphus ferox (Peringuey, 1896) 
 Metaxymorphus flaviceps (Motschulsky, 1864) 
 Metaxymorphus frenatus (Dejean, 1831) 
 Metaxymorphus glabricollis (Motschulsky, 1864) 
 Metaxymorphus goryi Chaudoir, 1850 
 Metaxymorphus inconspicuus (Peringuey, 1896) 
 Metaxymorphus infestans (Basilewsky, 1986) 
 Metaxymorphus lineellus (Boheman, 1848) 
 Metaxymorphus modestus Peringuey, 1896  
 Metaxymorphus namaquensis Peringuey, 1896 
 Metaxymorphus picturatus (Basilewsky, 1986)
 Metaxymorphus pictus Peringuey, 1896 
 Metaxymorphus pusillus Peringuey, 1896 
 Metaxymorphus recticollis Peringuey, 1899 
 Metaxymorphus robustus Peringuey, 1904 
 Metaxymorphus stigmatellus Peringuey, 1896 
 Metaxymorphus vicinus Peringuey, 1896

References

Lebiinae